Arignar Anna Zoological Park (abbreviated AAZP), also known as the Vandalur Zoo, is a zoological garden located in Vandalur, is in the southwestern part of Chennai, Tamil Nadu, about  from the Chennai Central and  from Chennai Airport. Established in 1855, it is the first public zoo in India. It is affiliated with the Central Zoo Authority of India. The zoo houses 2,553 species of flora and fauna across . As of 2012 the park houses around 1,500 wild species, including 46 endangered species, in its 160 enclosures. As of 2010, there were about 47 species of mammals, 63 species of birds, 31 species of reptiles, 5 species of amphibians, 28 species of fishes, and 10 species of insects in the park. The park, with an objective to be a repository of the state's fauna, is credited with being the second wildlife sanctuary in Tamil Nadu after Mudumalai National Park.

History

In 1854, the city's first zoo began in the Pantheon (museum) complex with a cheetah and a tiger. This attracted people from distant places and Edward Green Balfour, the then director of the Government Central Museum at Madras, persuaded the Nawab of the Carnatic to donate his entire animal collection to the museum. This attracted large crowds and became the nucleus of the Madras Zoo, which was founded in 1855. Although Balfour started the zoo on the museum premises, a year later it had over 300 animals, including mammals, birds and reptiles. It was later transferred to the Madras Corporation and shifted to People's Park near Chennai Central railway station at Park Town in 1861, as it was growing. The municipal zoological garden occupied one end of the  park and was open free to the public.

By 1975, the zoo could no longer expand, and it had to be moved out of the city because of space constraints and increased noise pollution due to the city's high-density traffic. Hence it was planned in 1976 to maintain the animals in the zoo in good simulated conditions. In 1976, the Tamil Nadu Forest Department set aside  in the Vandalur Reserve Forest on the outskirts of the city to build the current zoo, which is the largest zoological garden in India and the Indian Subcontinent and one of the largest in the world. Work started in 1979 at an initial cost of  75 million, and the zoo in its new premises was officially opened to public on 24 July 1985 by the then chief minister of Tamil Nadu M. G. Ramachandran, when most of the works were completed. In the beginning, the area was nothing more than a scrub jungle, with practically no tree cover. The zoo authorities and people from surrounding villages collected seeds of different trees from neighbouring areas and afforested the zoo area.

In 1955, the zoo held the first All-India Zoo Superintendents Conference, as part of the centenary celebrations. The zoo is named after Tamil politician Annadurai commonly called as Aringar Annadurai.

Objectives, organisational structure, and revenue generation

The main objectives of the park are ex-situ propagation of critically endangered species to prevent their extinction, wildlife education and interpretation aimed at a wider public appreciation of wildlife, and wildlife research to promote wildlife conservation and management.

The overall management of the zoo is vested in the director of the park. The director is also the member secretary of the Zoo Authority of Tamil Nadu (formed under Tamil Nadu Society Act), which started functioning from 1 April 2005, and comprises the following members:

The Secretary to Government, Environment and Forest Department (Chairman)
The Secretary to Government, Finance Department (Member)
The Secretary to Government, Animal Husbandry and Fisheries Department (Member)
The Principal Chief Conservator of Forests, Tamil Nadu (Member)
Vice-Chancellor, Tamil Nadu Veterinary and Animal Sciences University (Member)
Director, Department of Environment (Member)
Commissioner, Tourism Department (Member)
Principal Chief Conservator of Forests and Chief Wildlife Warden, Tamil Nadu (Member)
Chief Conservator of Forests and Director, AAZP (Member Secretary)

The Government of Tamil Nadu provides funds for paying the zoo staff and maintenance of zoo vehicles. Other expenditures, such as maintenance of animal enclosures, feed for animals, animal health care, maintenance of zoo, drainage, water, electricity and maintenance of battery-operated vehicles, are met from the income generated by the zoo, chiefly by means of the entry fee. Income is also generated from battery-operated vehicle (BOV) charges, elephant rides, toilets lease, bicycle charges from TI cycles, the leased parking area and food and beverages outlets such as Hotel Tamil Nadu, Aavin, and TANTEA. The yearly budget of the park for its developmental and maintenance work is approved by the governing board.

The functions of the zoo are carried out by several departments, namely, administration, animal welfare, commissary (store), transport, research, education and awareness, veterinary, horticulture, security and sanitation. There are currently about 262 full-time staff against a sanctioned strength of 300, including forest rangers, wildlife keepers, biologists and veterinary doctors.

The director in the rank of chief conservator of forests, supported by one additional director, one deputy director, and two assistant directors, heads the park. Other staff include 27 ministerial staff, 39 field staff (including drivers) and 172 permanent workers under various categories. In addition to the regular staff, the park has also employed contract labourers. The veterinary department is headed by one veterinary officer and two veterinary assistant surgeons with two veterinary attendants. The task of education, interpretation, and research is executed by three biologists of the park.

Location and boundaries

The whole of the park and the proposed night safari zone lie within the Vandalur Reserve Forest area located immediately to the southwest of Tambaram Air Force Station. The eastern and western sides of the park are bordered by Hassan and Otteri lakes, respectively. The main entrance of the zoo lies on the eastern side of the Chennai–Trichy Highway (Grand Southern Trunk Road), also known as the Grand Southern Trunk (GST) Road, near its intersection with the Vandalur–Kelambakkam Road. The lion safari range lies in the north-eastern side of the park, pervading into the reserve forest area, and the rescue and rehabilitation centre and the proposed night safari zone are located at the southern side across the Vandalur–Kelambakkam Road. To reach this Arignar Anna Zoological Park, buses are available from all the parts of the Chennai. The Vandalur Railway station is at a distance of about 1Km from the main entrance from the Park.

Environment

The zoo is located within the Vandalur Reserve Forest area. The park was designed to keep the natural vegetation of the area intact except where enclosures, roads, and structures had to be constructed. Originally a sparse scrub forest invaded by weeds, consisting of species such as Carissa sp., Gmelina sp., Eugenia sp., Acacia sp., Instia sp. and a few other dry evergreen forest species, the park's vegetation was gradually enriched by planting dry evergreen species. The entire campus has been fortified by means of a compound wall, preventing any biotic interference in the park and allowing the natural growth of vegetation, which give the park the look of a natural forest. The park is built based on the 'open zoo' concept. The exhibits were originally based on taxonomic and geographical distribution of the species, but have now been replaced by ecological niches and habitats. The order of priority is local species, followed by regional, national, and international species. The use of moats has made it possible to house predator and prey in extended enclosures that provide a panorama of wildlife. There are over 75 moated enclosures in the park. Enrichments in the form of ladders, climbing materials, etc. are provided for the animals to move around the enclosure freely.

Smaller mammals and other exhibits are located along three inner roads. The park area is dotted with large open island-type enclosures and chain-link fence, with camouflaged wet and dry moats, hidden walls, and simulated natural environment for the residents of the park.

The remaining area makes up the free-range zone—an open area which makes up the bulk of the park and where animals such as deer and jackals are left to roam free. There are more than 500 deer of different varieties and an equal number of jackals in the free-range zone. In addition, there are four enclosures for deer—each housing about 30 animals. Deer and jackals are found in equal numbers and are known for their fast-breeding ability, especially in their natural environment. The deer–jackal ratio is maintained by the 'natural method of selection'—allowing the stronger ones to prey on the weaker ones—a natural way of balancing the ecological system.

Otteri lake situated on the north-western side within the park premises acts as a roosting ground for a wide array of aquatic migratory birds such as storks, herons, ibises, pelicans and cormorants, making it a bird watchers' paradise. The  lake, surrounded by a variety of trees, receives the run-off water from nearly half the area of the park and attracts a large number of migratory birds in October, November, and December. Both terrestrial and aquatic birds of about 70 species congregate here during the season. On average, around 10,000 migratory birds visit the lake each year. About 230 saplings of Barringtonia, a species native to mangrove habitats, have been planted inside the lake to attract more birds.

Exhibits

The park has 81 enclosures and more than 170 species of mammals, birds and reptiles, The park contains about 138 plant species, including cashew and eucalyptus. The dense vegetation of the park supports about 56 species of butterfly.

Animals at the park includes:

Mammals
 Asian elephant
 Asiatic lion
 Asiatic wild ass
 Barasingha
 Bengal tiger
 Binturong
 Blackbuck
 Black giant squirrel
 Bonnet macaque
 Chimpanzee
 Chital
 Common palm civet 
 Dhole 
 Eurasian otter
 Gaur
 Grant's zebra
 Gray slender loris
 Golden jackal
 Himalayan black bear
 Hippopotamus
 Indian crested porcupine
 Indian giant squirrel
 Indian grey mongoose
 Indian hog deer
 Indian leopard
 Indian muntjac
 Indian wolf
 Jungle cat
 Lion-tailed macaque
 Nilgai
 Nilgiri langur
 Rhesus macaque
 Sambar deer
 Sloth bear
 Small Indian civet
 Sri Lankan spotted chevrotain
 Striped hyena
 Tufted capuchin
 Tufted gray langur
 Wild boar
 Yellow baboon
Birds
 Alexandrine parakeet
 Black-crowned night heron
 Black-headed ibis
 Black-necked stork
 Black swan
 Blue-and-yellow macaw
 Budgerigar
 Cockatiel
 Common ostrich
 Common pheasant
 Demoiselle crane
 Emu
 Eurasian eagle-owl
 Eurasian spoonbill
 Fischer's lovebird
 Greater adjutant
 Greater rhea
 Golden pheasant
 Indian peafowl
 Rose-ringed parakeet
 Rosy pelican
 Sarus crane
 Scarlet macaw
 Southern cassowary
 White-bellied sea eagle
 White-rumped vulture
Reptiles
 Gharial
 Indian cobra
 Indian python
 Indian star tortoise
 King cobra
 Mugger crocodile 
 Saltwater crocodile
 Spectacled caiman

Safaris

The safari contains 15 lions which are involved in a breeding programme. As the lions started forming groups according to their instincts and compatibility, the zoo authorities apportioned two small areas within the existing safari area in 2012, work on which started in January 2012 at a cost of  600,000, enabling the visitors to see one pride in the open forest area and the other two in the newly created fenced yards. These enclosures had been created on a 160-sq m area, with facilities such as rest shed and water trough. Each pride consists of three to four animals.

The deer park was opened in 2008.

An elephant safari was introduced in the zoo in the summer of 2008, providing a ride on elephants for a tour around the zoo. The park is the only place after Mudumalai in the Nilgiris that organises elephant safari rides in the state. There are 3 elephants in the park and 2 more have been brought from Mudumalai to start the safari.

The park authorities plan to create a new gaur safari in 2011 in part of the current lion safari area. The lion safari has two geographical regions—hilly and plains. In 2007, a night safari project in the park was promoted with two components, namely, an animal exhibit area and an entertainment area. The night safari was being established for providing opportunity to observe the natural wildlife behaviour and activities in the night hours. Initially, it was expected to be implemented during 2010–11 at a cost of  40.2 million. With the initially allocated sum, the zoo authorities completed construction of enclosures for tigers, elephants, gaur, sloth bears, spotted deer and sambar and a large number of saplings was raised to be planted around the night safari area. Nearly  78.7 million was spent on construction of the enclosures, surveying the lands, perimeter wall and laying circular roads for the night safari. With delay in getting funds from the Union Ministry, the project was put on hold and the zoo prepared another proposal for  820 million for night safari in July 2011. However, this too was deferred by the state government.

Sanctuary aviaries

Two aviaries at the zoo were designed to imitate specific bird sanctuaries in Tamil Nadu. The Point Calimere Aviary represents a sanctuary on a bay on the Coromandel Coast of the District of Nagapattinam, where migratory birds including flamingos, seagulls, teals, storks and herons can be seen between October and February every year. These species can be seen year-round in this aviary, where flamingos can feed in the shallows while seagulls swim in deeper water. The Vedanthangal Sanctuary Aviary represents a sanctuary located in the district of Kanchipuram. It is planted with gum arabic tree, bamboo and other tree species which offer convenient places for birds to rest. Birds such as white ibis, painted stork, night heron and grey heron are found here, and baskets have been provided to facilitate breeding.

Walk-through aviary
The terrestrial aviary was opened in 1992, but was closed within a few years due to maintenance issues. It was renovated and reopened in 2010 as the Bio Centre. This  walk-through aviary cost about  2 million and is located on a slope behind the tiger house. The aviary is the biggest such facility in a zoo in the country. The facility features fifteen-metre-tall fences to facilitate free flight of birds within the area. The aviary is home to about 245 birds of different species including Alexandrine parakeet, rose-ringed parakeet, blue rock pigeon, common myna, Indian koel, common babbler, white-browed bulbul, francolin, red-vented bulbul, red-whiskered bulbul, wagtail, pipit, orange-headed thrush, red-wattled lapwing, little brown dove and spotted dove.

The aviary is surrounded by a  wall, and the four sides above this are covered with steel and blue-coloured nylon net in order to provide an open-sky effect. The ground is floored by tiled footpath lawned with Korean grass to maintain the humidity level. The moist deciduous habitat supports 22 tree and shrub species. Fruit-bearing trees such as mango, pomegranate, guava, sapota (Sapodilla), jamoon, Singapore cherry and chillies have been planted for the benefit of fruit-eating birds. Heaps of dry leaves, dung, dry wood waste and rotten fruits have been provided for insect-eating birds. The zoo has also set up a mud bath facility for the birds. Palm trees with holes have been planted to facilitate natural breeding of parakeets, and heaps of stones have been provided for ground-nesting birds. The aviary also has fountains and water bodies for the birds. As of 2018, the zoo had about 89 species of birds, amounting to 1,604 individuals, of which 61 were native varieties and 28 were exotic breeds.

Butterfly house
The butterfly house, constructed at a cost of  6 million, has more than 25 host plants and landscaped habitats, such as bushes, lianas, streams, waterfall and rock-gardens, that attract many species of butterflies such as the common Mormon, crimson rose, mottled emigrant, blue tiger, evening brown and lime butterfly. A network of ponds interconnected by streams maintains humidity in the area. The park covers an area of 5 acres. The butterfly garden with an insect museum at the entrance is set up by the Tamil Nadu Agricultural University (TNAU), Coimbatore. The insect museum has been planned with an exhibit area comprising insect exhibits representing the most common Indian species of all orders of insects both in the form of preserved specimens and in the form of photographs.

Reptile house/serpentarium
The reptile house or the serpentarium is built, at the cost of  0.4 million, in a twining snake-like model with entrance and exit points in the snake's mouth and tail, respectively. The house was opened to public in the year 1989 and has 24 enclosures exhibiting 4 species of poisonous and 10 species of non-poisonous snakes. It contains a total of 104 snakes, including 41 Indian pythons, 21 Burmese pythons and four cobras. The park has initiated controlled breeding programme for Indian rock python. Each vivarium has been renovated by changing substratum and providing perch and hide outs. The top of the opening in RCC roof is closed with transparent acrylic sheet to avoid rain and the walled enclosure enables the snake to exhibit all natural behaviours. The king cobra is scientifically kept and maintained in constant temperature by providing air conditioning and hot spot.

Amphibian house
The park stands first in the country for establishing an amphibian captive facility, and it is the only zoo in the country to have amphibians on display. Locally available species such as Indian tree frog (Polypedates maculatus), common Indian toad (Bufo melanasticus), Indian bull frog (Rana tigirina), Indian cricket frog (Limnonectus limnocharis) and Indian pond frog (Euphlyctis cyanophlyctis) are exhibited at the Amphibian Centre. A water-recycling system has been introduced to keep the house clean, and plants have been planted inside each tank to add lushness.

Crocodile enclosure

The park houses many species of crocodiles such as the gharial, the mugger crocodile, the saltwater crocodile and the spectacled caiman. The eight enclaves for crocodiles comprise about 220 individuals, including 125 adult specimens belonging to the six varieties. This includes two pairs of adult fresh water crocodiles. Many of the species also breed here.

Primate house
The primate house includes some unique endangered primate species like the lion-tailed macaque, Nilgiri langur and chimpanzee. The park is also the National Studbook Keeper for the endangered lion-tailed macaque, nominated by the CZA. With the successful execution of the Co-ordinated Captive Breeding Programme (CCBP), the park accounts for around 36 percent of lion-tailed macaques in the country's zoos as of 2011.

World of nocturnal animals
The nocturnal animals section houses six species. The biological rhythm and cycle of the animals has been modified so that they are active during the daytime and sleep during the nighttime.

Small mammals house
The newly constructed Small Mammals House has animals such as the Indian giant squirrel and the black giant squirrel. The zoo also houses many small carnivores and animals of the Western Ghats.

Aquarium
The shark-modelled aquarium, with its entrance and exit points in the form of gills of the shark, is set amidst a pond and houses 31 species of fresh-water fishes. The pond surrounding the aquarium too has different varieties of fishes.

There are 28 types, including angel fish, black ghost, electric yellow lab, glass fish, giant catfish, oscar fish, tiger barb, rykin gold fish, neon tetra, and zebra danio.

Other sections
Other sections in the zoo include the prey–predator concept enclosures (tiger–sambar), Prehistoric Animal Park with life-size models of prehistoric animals and insectarium complex, apart from an interpretation centre, zoo school and children's park. The zoo school, opened in 2000, has formulated conservation, education and awareness programmes for academics and general public that includes teacher training, zoo outreach and volunteers programmes, such as Zoo Club Volunteer Programme and Animal Keepers Training Programme. The zoo also has a library with a collection of wildlife-related books. The library functions twice a week, on Mondays and Fridays.

Captive breeding

The Central Zoo Authority of India (CZA) has identified the park as coordinating zoo for the breeding programmes for endangered species as per the National Zoo Policy adopted by the Government of India in 1988, which states that the main objective of zoos will be to complement and strengthen national efforts in the conservation of the country's rich biodiversity and that the species which have no chance of survival in the wild would be bred under ex-situ conditions. The park has a high rate of success in captive breeding of lion-tailed macaques. In 2010, the zoo had 22 lion-tailed macaques, from a breeding pair that were brought to the zoo in 1983. The park is also successful in breeding other rare species in captivity, including ostrich, Asian palm civet, Indian gaur, wild dog, Asiatic lion, Nilgiri langur, sangai, hippo, Malabar giant squirrel, white tiger, Asiatic wolf, panther and bison. The zoo is among four in the country to have an ostrich. The park also undertakes cross-breeding as part of its conservation efforts. The park is also a participating zoo of the CZA for the captive breeding of rock python, Nilgiri langur, lion-tailed macaque, Asiatic lion, wild dog, Asiatic wolf, and gaur. The zoo also promotes exterior conservation—conservation of rare species in their natural habitat—whereby individuals born in the zoo are released in the wild after adequate training, as per the guidelines of the CZA.

Other facilities
The park has tree-lined paved paths for long treks inside the campus, enabling the visitors to walk  during a visit. There are about 9 such vehicles in addition to the 4 battery-operated vans used for the lion safari and 4 diesel-run road rails used for going around the zoo, and the approval has been given in 2017 for two more vehicles. Each vehicle can carry 15 to 20 people, and each trip takes about an hour. A trial program of 20 rental bicycles for visitors, including 5 for children, was launched in 2008 as an eco-friendly option intended to reduce demand for the battery-operated cars. An e-bike facility was also inaugurated on 20 February 2010. By the beginning of 2018, plans were on to install 32 CCTV cameras in the zoo.

Refreshment outlets include a snack bar run by the Tamil Nadu Tourism Development Corporation (TTDC), an ice cream parlour and a soft drinks counter—all near the entrance. The park also maintains 16 toilets and nearly two dozen drinking fountains within the premises for the visitors. The zoo is open to public from 8:30 am to 5:30 pm except on Tuesdays, when the zoo carries out weekly maintenance work. All the animals, especially the big cats, are back in their cages after 5.00 pm and most tourists prefer to visit them before going on to the other exhibits. The zoo has a guest house located on Kelambakkam Road.

The zoo is fenced on all sides by means of the perimeter wall. The zoo security is mainly carried out by the forest subordinate staff of rangers, foresters and forest guards along with zoo security staff, who conduct regular patrolling of animal enclosures, stores and other buildings. Night security is carried out under the command of one range officer and other subordinates. The zoo has also employed private security personnel. From 1 December 2010, four persons from a private security service have been deployed along with forest rangers for night patrolling.

In July 2013, ambulance facility, equipped with an oxygen cylinder, pulse monitor, critical care monitor, stretcher, surgical tools, small cages, tranquilizing darts and emergency medicines, for animals inside the premises was inaugurated.

A research and training facility was set up in 2017 at an estimated cost of 71.3 million. It will conduct research on subjects such as endangered animals and their reproduction, besides suggesting ways and means to address man–animal conflicts.

Renovation

In February 2011, the zoo began construction of a large new tiger cage at a cost of about  200,000, and the new cage will be linked to the existing one. The existing enclosure measures 26.64 feet in height, length and width. It will have separate entries for the animal keeper and the animals. Illuminated by solar-powered lights, it will have a sloping roof and good ventilation. There are 18 tigers in the zoo, 9 of which are white tigers.

For the first time since the shifting of the zoo from Park Town in 1979, the park underwent a major renovation in 2011, costing  32.5 million. The renovated entrance was inaugurated by the Chief Minister of Tamil Nadu, J. Jayalalithaa, on 19 June 2012. The new 6-m wide entrance features 250-m long, 2.7-m high brick-and-granite wall, with 43 mural relief sculptures representing different animals in the zoo and a 12-m fenced lawn. The main entrance tower is 10.5 m tall, with two adorning structures 8.5 m each on either side. Other additions include huge lawns covering nearly 300 m on both sides of the entrance, tiled floors, an interpretation centre (similar to the one at the Vedanthangal Bird Sanctuary) with LED displays at the entrance, additional ticket counters, and a souvenir shop selling memorabilia like T-shirts and artefacts showcasing the flora and fauna of the sub-continent. The new entrance also features 20 computerised ticket counters to handle huge crowds.

The zoo authorities are in the process of restoring and renovating the approach road to Otteri lake, located inside the zoo. Post-monsoon, the lake attracts many migratory birds, and the lake could act as an ideal spot to view birds at close quarters. Hence, a bird's viewpoint is being built to encourage bird watching.

Visitors
During April 2010–March 2011, the zoo received nearly 1,810,846 visitors, as against 1,187,904 visitors in 2006–2007. In November 2010, the total revenue was  46.9 million, against  40.2 million during October 2009. There has been an increase of more than 200,000 visitors in 2010 compared to 2009, and the park had recorded a 21 percent increase in the number of visitors. The number of visitors raises to the peak on the Kaanum Pongal day, a day in the festival season of mid-January, when the visitor count goes up to 63,000 on a single day. About 57,000 visitors arrived on the Kannum Pongal day of 2009, resulting in revenue of  1.015 million. It was 56,555 in 2010 and 57,217 in 2011. The all-time record of 63,000 visitors a day was registered on the Kannum Pongal day of 2012, resulting in revenue of  1.1 million.Less footfall in 2015-16 due to floods in November and December 2015.  Less footfall in 2016-17 due to closure of zoo for two months (12.12.2016 to 09.02.2017) after cyclone Vardah. 

The number of visitors to the zoo is steadily growing by an estimated 10 to 15 percent every year. The visitor statistics and the revenue generated over the past years are listed below:

The zoo management has started to live stream all the animals and birds present in the zoo. To watch the live streaming, zoo management has created a separate website for the visitors who are not able to visit the zoological park.

Programmes and activities

The park has a zoo club, comprising college students, which was formed in 1997. The club helps keep the premises clean, and the members also conduct educational programmes and carry out patrols.

Following the death of a llama at the park after swallowing a plastic bag, plastic materials have been banned inside the park premises. Visitors are frisked at the entrance to restrict all plastic goods. The members of the zoo club are 98 percent successful in controlling the entry of plastic materials inside the park. The zoo also plans to introduce 'Friends of the Zoo' programme in line with the National Zoo Policy, prepared by the Union Ministry of Environment and Forests in 1998.

The park launched a zoo newsletter in 2000 to serve as a source of current news and developments in the park. Efforts are being made to publish the newsletter at regular intervals.

From 22 to 24 September 2000, the park conducted a workshop for keeping and breeding amphibians in captivity for the first time in India.

The park, along with the Chennai Snake Park, Madras Crocodile Bank and the Mysore Zoo, is slated to become a nodal point for captive breeding of endangered pythons in the country, especially the Indian rock python (Python molurus) and reticulated python (Python reticulatus).

In 2007, the zoo started to construct a separate breeding enclosure for the lion-tailed macaque, proposing to bring under Foreign Animal Exchange Programme. The enclosure was built at a cost of  1.6 million at a silent, remote place in the park to provide a natural habitat for the animals and to ensure breeding. The total enclosure measures about 3,000 sq m, including three rooms with about 250 sq ft. Three pairs of macaque could be kept in these rooms. The habitat is planted with fruit-bearing trees, including gooseberry and mangoes.

In July 2008, the world's first non-invasive birth control surgery on mugger crocodiles was performed in the park by the surgeons of the Madras Veterinary College to control breeding and inbreeding.

In September 2008, the park initiated Adopt An Animal, an animal adoption programme, which has seen a few takers so far in the state, with less than 20 sponsors, mostly individuals and companies, coming forward. The first adoption began with adopting a spotted deer, a peacock, two lovebirds and a parrot in June 2009. The park has received funds to a tune of  2.3 million from individuals and organisations for adopting animals between August 2010 and March 2011. The Zoo has also started online adoption of animals through the website Online Animal Adoption   , where in anyone can adopt animals online from the Zoo starting Rs.100. 

The park has developed an informative and illustrative guide in collaboration with the Centre for Environment Education (CEE), Ahmedabad, providing zoo ethics and comprehensive information including road map to the animal enclosures and visitor amenities.

In 2012, for the first time in the country, the park adopted 'social grouping' of animals in captivity, where members of same species would be kept together, to showcase how they interact in groups.

In March 2013, a blood transfusion performed on a 10-year-old hyena by a four-member team of doctors in the zoo, marking the first successful blood transfusion done for a wild species in an Indian zoo.

In April 2018, the zoo launched a mobile app to provide information on the zoo, online ticket booking, interactive map providing a virtual tour guide inside the premises, and so forth. Live streaming of animals on the Internet also began in the same period. The mobile App is available on Android and on Apple Store for download. Vandalur Zoo Mobile App 

The Zoo School is the body under the Vandalur Zoo which conducts a lot of programs like the Zoo Ambassador Programme, Species Ambassador Programs etc and all the events can be registered online on the website

Vandalur Zoo is celebrating the wildlife week 2022 with a series of events where school students and general public can participate in a list of online and onsite activities at the zoo - List of Wildlife Week 2022 Events

Animal care
Owing to its vastness and round-the-clock availability of animal medical care facilities, most of the rescued animals in the state, especially elephants, are brought to the park. With Chennai serving, unfortunately, as a transit point for wildlife smugglers in Southeast Asian countries, the zoo also receives many recovered endangered species for rehabilitation. The three important captive management practices of the zoo that contributed to the longevity of animals include environment enrichment, psychological well-being and animal husbandry and veterinary care. There has been a considerable reduction in the mortality rate of animals in captivity at the park. Between April 2010 and March 2011, only 22 animals were reported dead, of which 9 died due to old age and the remaining owing to other health-related problems and infighting. Incidents of infighting, although rare, have been reported in the park.

With the guidance provided by the CZA, kraals—fencing of a portion of the moated enclosure—were created in the herbivore enclosures in 2003 in order to isolate and treat sick or wounded animal. Herbivores with physical problems are isolated in the facility to be checked by the vets. One of the corners of the enclosure is chosen mainly to keep visitors away from the treated animals. Kraals have been created in the enclosures of spotted deer, blackbuck, sambar, nilghai, barking deer, hog deer, brow-antlered deer, moufflon and bison. To make the animals get accustomed to the kraal, the feed is kept inside the premises. Apart from treating animals, the kraal also acts as a place for isolating animals in rut. For example, during mating season, males often fight with each other leading to problems for the veterinarians. To overcome this, the males are kept in kraals in isolation from other males. Kraals also help research scholars in observing and recording the movement and other activities of the animal, thus helping with studying their behavioural pattern.

The zoo also has a zoo kitchen, zoo hospital and quarantine facility. Every day, about 190 kg of non-perishable food items, 300 kg of perishable foods, 750 kg of beef and fish, 430 kg of cattle feed and 2,000 kg of fodder are being provided to the zoo inmates. A rat-breeding centre has been constructed near the store house to cater the needs of snakes. The fodder bank raised in the zoo premises fulfils the fodder requirement of the herbivores population in the park. The zoo orchard with trees such as mango, guava, and coconut supplies fruits for the park's daily requirement.

Rescue and rehabilitation centre
With the banning of training and exhibition of five species of animals, namely, lion, tiger, panther, bear and monkey enforced by the Government of India in 1998, a  rescue and rehabilitation centre for animals was established next to the zoo with the assistance of the CZA in 2001. The area was acquired from the research wing of the Tamil Nadu Forest Department in continuity with the fodder bank of the zoo with an assistance of  14.598 million. The centre provides temporary and long-term care for confiscated and abandoned endangered animals, such as lions and tigers rescued from circuses, and is home to about 32 lions and 7 tigers. It has a capacity to house 40 lions and 20 tigers. It also has a reptile house and an aviary. The park is one of the five zoos in the country identified and funded by the CZA for the rehabilitation of circus animals. The rehabilitation centre is not open to the visitors.

Zoo veterinary hospital
The zoo veterinary hospital is responsible for disease prevention and health care management of the park's captive population. The hospital has a well-equipped operation theatre, in-patient ward, radiology unit, laboratory, clinical room, pathology room, quarantine facilities and convalescent yard fully functional to cater the needs of complete animal health care. It also includes a modern diagnostic laboratory with facility for periodic coprological examination, identification of causative organism, antibiotic sensitivity, pregnancy diagnosis, haematology, serology and urinalysis.

Conservation

Water management
The remainder comes from 13 open wells, 5 borewells and the Otteri lake within the zoo premises. In 2011, the zoo started constructing rainwater harvesting systems, including small bunds and check dams, to store water during the monsoon that would otherwise be lost. Three troughs and a check dam have already been constructed in the safari to help store the natural runoff from the nearby hillock.

Power management
As of 2012, the zoo uses a lone 100-kV generator to meet the power shortage. The zoo has proposed to buy another 100-kV generator at a cost of  800,000.

In 2011, to save power and increase safety, solar powered lights were installed in 14 enclosures at the park at a cost of  200,000. The lion safari (old and new) and enclosures for white tigers, panthers, bears, hyenas, chimpanzee, a pair of lions, jackal, wild dog, owl, sloth bear, and brown bear are lit by solar power for about three hours every evening. Each system includes a solar panel and a 250-kv battery connected to a 33-volt bulb and can supply power for up to 8 hours.

Heat management
The soaring temperature in Chennai, especially during summer, demands extra care for residents of the zoo. Fortunately, the temperature inside the zoo campus is a couple of degrees lower than outside any time of the year, primarily due to the lush greenery. The park also maintains an exclusive summer management schedule. All animal enclosures have thatched roofs and fresh river sand spread on the floor to make it cooler for the animals. Water is sprinkled on the sand to provide extra cooling. Roofs of water birds' enclosures are covered with coconut leaves and wet gunny bags. Caves that are exposed directly to the sun are put under a shower twice a day. The enclosure for the king cobra has an air conditioner in order to provide an environment similar to its natural habitat as the species cannot withstand the summer heat. For birds, the topmost part of the cage is covered with jute bags, and water is sprinkled three times a day. Based on the temperature, cucumber, buttermilk, apple and banana are also served to herbivores. The zoo has also set up sprinklers to help animals beat the summer heat and is planning to set up about 20 more sprinklers at the deer safari.

In 2011, to increase the green cover, the forest department initiated to plant 25,000 saplings in the zoo.

Incidents

In January 2002, when a panther from the Vandalur reserve forest entered into the zoo premises, the zoo was closed for over 45 days to facilitate search for the animal. After several attempts, the animal was finally trapped, and it was named after the zoo keeper, Arumugam, who first noticed the feline in the trap cage and alerted his superiors.

On 12 November 2007, a 13-ft long reticulated python was found in a ventilator inside the pygmy hippopotamus enclosure in the zoo. According to the zoo officials, the rescued python could have escaped from its enclosure, when it was young, 4 to 5 years ago. When the workers tried to take the reptile, it bit one of the animal keepers, but since it was a non-poisonous one, the animal keeper was not harmed fatally and was provided treatment for the injury. The reptile was feeding on small mammals, roaming freely inside the zoo, which helped it survive without any problem.

On the night of 10 July 2010, three sand boas (Eryx johnii), out of five in the enclosure, were reported stolen from the zoo.

On 2 August 2011, a 17-year-old male gaur named Mani was found gored to death in his enclosure, by a younger male named Vijay and aged 6, allegedly over fight for a mate. The zoo officials reported Mani was the oldest of the herd of gaur living in the zoo, and added that this is an unusual incident. On 20 August 2017, the same gaur Vijay also killed another 20-year-old male named Ratnam.

In January 2011, 50 birds died under dubious circumstances in the park within a month. Later, postmortem report found that they were poisoned.

In September 2011, a nine-feet-long Burmese python was reported missing from its enclosure at the serpentarium. The animal keeper forgot to close the channel connecting the snake's enclosure with an outlet outside with a piece of wood after the weekly clean-up, and the python had managed to crawl out. On 5 December 2011, after about 3 months, the animal was found in the bushes near the enclosure after swallowing a chicken kept near the enclosure as bait.

A three-year-old male white tiger succumbed to injuries suffered during a fight with its potential mate, a nine-year-old royal Bengal tigress, on 7 August 2013. The tigress, also severely injured following the fight. Deep wounds in the brain had resulted in the tiger's death. The incident came as a blow to officials at the Arignar Anna Zoological Park in Vandalur, who have been trying to prevent in-breeding among white tigers and strengthen the species gene through cross breeding. Christened by former Chief Minister M. Karunanidhi in September 2010, the deceased white tiger, Sembian, was paired with a nine-year-old royal Bengal tigress, Sathya, a few months ago. A litter of Dhole puppies were born in December 2021 and was available for viewing for public in an enclosure from June 2022 and this attracts a lot of visitors.

COVID-19 pandemic 
A 9-year-old lioness, named Neela and a 12-year-old lion, named Pathbanathan died due to COVID-19 in the month of June 2021. Out of 15 lions, 11 were tested positive for SARS‑CoV‑2. The zoo sent three set of samples to Centre for Cellular and Molecular Biology (CCMB), National Institute of High Security Animal Diseases (NIHSAD) and Indian Veterinary Research Institute (IVRI) for genome sequencing. On 6 June 2021, Tamil Nadu Chief Minister M. K. Stalin visited the zoo, to review the measures being taken by zoo authories. The experts from Tamil Nadu Veterinary and Animal Sciences University (TANUVAS) were consulted to deal the outbreak.

The Future

In 2012, a wild-life research institute was proposed to be built inside the park at an expense of  342.4 million. This institute will be further developed in three years with the estimate totaling  743.7 million, with centres for ecological education and awareness, wildlife forensic research, and herbivores and carnivores field research.

In 2012, a turtle-shaped building was planned at an estimated cost of  400,000 to house various types of turtles in the park.

In February 2013, Chief Minister Jayalalithaa ordered to establish a wildlife research centre at the Park at a cost of  271.3 million. The centre will house eight research laboratories, including a nature education and awareness centre, wildlife forensic science research centre, and field research centres for herbivorous and carnivorous animals and will have two scientists, four junior researchers and two assistant veterinary doctors. The centre would cost the government an annual continuing expense of  2.699 million. The foundation stone for the research centre, which will be located opposite the main campus, was laid on 15 March 2013. The construction work is expected to be completed by mid-2014.

In July 2013, the public works department (PWD) was expected to begin work on a butterfly park in the zoo, an initiative sanctioned in 2001. The park is being constructed at a cost of  50 million. The caterpillar-shaped park with a landscaped habitat, nectar gardens, a walking bridge, pathways for visitors, breeding and rearing centres, and rock gardens will be built on 2.5 hectares, including the actual built-up area of 2,000 sq ft near the Otteri lake. The park has a network of ponds interconnected by streams to maintain humidity level. The caterpillar design was chosen because the 60-ft-long tube-like structure made of acrylic sheets, which will keep the inside of the building cool by absorbing less heat. The park will have more than 40 Indian species, including the common leopard, blue Mormon, yellow pansy, red Helen, and common Jezebel. Apart from local butterfly species, the park will host at least 80 exotic species of butterflies including the four-barred swordtail from Australia, the common savanna bush brown from South Africa, the Australian painted lady and the Danaid eggfly. The park will have a capacity to accommodate at least 100 persons at any given time and is expected to be ready by September 2013.

In 2013, a forest and wildlife museum was planned at the zoo, for which a budget of  2 million has been earmarked by the state forest ministry, including  500,000 for preparing display furniture,  200,000 for labelling, special light arrangements and fans, and  1.3 million for the collection and preparation of materials, a herbarium, xylarium, entomological collection, portraits, soil and rock collections and artefacts. The museum will be built near the exit gate on a 2,000 sq ft area. The museum is expected to be completed by the end of 2013–2014 financial year.

In March 2020, a safari world was planned at the zoo at a cost of  115 million, which would help visitors watch wild animals at close quarters.

Zoo Museum
The zoo also has a forest museum near the entrance, providing information about insects, plants, minerals, ores, and others.

See also
 Flora and fauna of Chennai
 Guindy National Park
 Chennai Snake Park
 Madras Crocodile Bank
 Vedanthangal Bird Sanctuary
 Pulicat Lake Bird Sanctuary
 Mudumalai National Park
 Point Calimere Wildlife and Bird Sanctuary
 Periyar National Park
 Rajiv Gandhi National Park

References

External links

 Chennai Zoo live stream showing how animals are spending time amid lockdown
 Chennai's zoo animals via the virtual ambassadors camp

Zoos in Tamil Nadu
Geography of Chennai
Protected areas of Tamil Nadu
Tourist attractions in Chennai
1855 establishments in India
Memorials to C. N. Annadurai
Zoos established in 1855